Jacob Ba (born 20 January 1984) was a Mauritanian international footballer.

Career

Club career
Born in Saint-Louis, Senegal, Ba has played club football in Senegal, France, Spain, Morocco and Belgium for Linguère, Martigues, Gazélec Ajaccio, Dijon, Tours, Gueugnon, Terrassa, Kenitra, Union Royale Namur, Aurillac FCA, Angoulême CFC, Limoges FC and SO Cholet.

International career
Ba made his international debut for Mauritania in 2008, earning four caps in total.

References

1984 births
Living people
Mauritanian footballers
Mauritania international footballers
Mauritanian expatriate footballers
FC Martigues players
Dijon FCO players
Tours FC players
FC Gueugnon players
Terrassa FC footballers
ASC Linguère players
Expatriate footballers in Morocco
FC Aurillac Arpajon Cantal Auvergne players
Sportspeople from Saint-Louis, Senegal
Association football midfielders
Mauritanian expatriate sportspeople in Belgium
Mauritanian expatriate sportspeople in Morocco
Mauritanian expatriate sportspeople in Spain
Mauritanian expatriate sportspeople in France
Mauritanian expatriate sportspeople in Senegal
Expatriate footballers in Senegal
Expatriate footballers in France
Expatriate footballers in Belgium
Expatriate footballers in Spain
Angoulême Charente FC players
Limoges FC players
KAC Kénitra players